Suzanne Le Mignot (born January 25, 1970) is a television news anchor and reporter for WBBM-TV in Chicago.

Early life and education 

Le Mignot earned a bachelor's degree with honors in mass communications from the University of South Florida in 1993.

Professional career 

Le Mignot began her broadcasting career while she was in college, working from 1989 until 1993 at the University of South Florida-owned, PBS-affiliated, WUSF-TV in Tampa, Florida as a production assistant and associate producer.  She also worked as a news anchor and reporter in Belgrade, Serbia from 1991 until 1992.

After college, Le Mignot joined WBBM radio in Chicago as a news anchor and reporter in 1994.  In 1995, she joined WTMJ-AM in Milwaukee as an anchor-reporter.  She also worked briefly as a news anchor at WGN-AM in Chicago before rejoining WBBM in late 1996.

Le Mignot began working for WBBM-TV as a free-lance reporter in 1995, and moved up to full-time status with the station (and therefore quit WBBM radio) in late 1999, when she became WBBM-TV's correspondent for Chicago's South Side and south suburbs.  In 2000, Le Mignot became an early morning news anchor at WBBM-TV, a role she held until 2001, when she returned to dayside general assignment reporting duties.

In February 2002, the Chicago Sun-Times reported that Le Mignot's contract would not be renewed by WBBM-TV, and she briefly left the station.  However, she signed a new contract in June 2002 and returned to the station.

In early 2006, Le Mignot became the weekend morning news anchor at WBBM-TV.  She current co-anchors with Mike Puccinelli, and she also performs general assignment reporting during the week.

In 2007, WBBM-TV management considered promoting Le Mignot to being weekend evening news anchor.  However, station bosses promoted Mai Martinez to the role instead.

Awards 

Le Mignot won an Associated Press award in 2007 for a piece she reported on the inability by commuter railroads' bomb-sniffing dogs to detect explosives.  She also won local and national Emmy awards in 2008.

Personal 

Le Mignot lives in the Gold Coast area of Chicago.

References

External links 
 CBS Chicago profile

Living people
Television anchors from Chicago
American television reporters and correspondents
1970 births